Jalalpur is a town, tehsil and a municipal board in Ambedkar Nagar district in the Indian state of Uttar Pradesh, India.

Geography

The city is directly connected to Azamgarh, Akbarpur, Shahganj, Rajesultanpur, Varansi, Faizabad, Ayodhya, Lucknow, Kanpur by private bus.

Demographics
 India census, Jalalpur had a population of 29,634. Males constitute 51% of the population and females 49%. Jalalpur has an average literacy rate of 69%, higher than the national average of 59.5%: male literacy is 73%, and female literacy is 64%. In Jalalpur, 16% of the population is under 6 years of age.

Notable people
 Anwar Jalalpuri (1947–2018), Indian poet and writer who translated the Geeta to Urdu, entitled "Urdu Shairi Mein Geeta", also worked in the film, Dedh Ishqiya.
 Hashim Raza Jalalpuri, Indian poet and writer who translated 16th century Poetess Meerabai's Poetry to Urdu, entitled "Meerabai Urdu Shairi Mein".

References

Cities and towns in Ambedkar Nagar district